Honoré V (Honoré Gabriel Grimaldi; 13/14 May 1778 – 2 October 1841) was Prince of Monaco and Duke of Valentinois. He was the first son of Honoré IV of Monaco and Louise d'Aumont.

Regent
Illnesses resulting from his imprisonment incapacitated Honoré IV in his later years, and following the re-establishment of the Principality in 1814, a regency was established to rule in Honoré's name.  This regency was directed, first, by his brother Joseph Grimaldi, then from 1815 by his son, the Hereditary Prince Honoré, who succeeded him in 1819 as Sovereign Prince Honoré V.

Reign
A professor of the period, Victor de la Canorgue, wrote of Prince Honoré in negative terms: extravagant and fond of luxuries for himself, but miserly for others, even his own family, to whom he gave "pensions disproportionate to his means." This professor endeavored to collect accounts of the reigns of Honoré V and of his brother and successor, Prince Florestan, and to translate them from Italian to French, for the purpose of better understanding the causes of the ever-increasing anti-monarchist movements, especially in former parts of the Principality like Menton and Roquebrune-Cap-Martin. One ordinance, dated from 1815, suggested that Prince Honoré V was not only miserly but greedy, that he brought even "the benches of the parish church, which some persons had built at their own expense", under his control, for his own profit.

Gustave Saige described him as a loner who did not trust anyone, including his brother, to help him govern. He was invisible to the public. His focus was on the crippled economy of Monaco; he raised taxes and tried to restore the tobacco plant his grandfather Honoré III had founded but which had been closed by the government of Turin. He endeavored to open factories and initiate citrus farm cooperatives in order put people to work, generate production, and alleviate poverty. However, none of his efforts raised his popularity, as his measures were seen by the people as autocratic.

Child and succession
Honoré V never married. He had a son, with his mistress Félicité de Gamaches, Louis Gabriel Oscar Grimaldi, born in Paris on 9 June 1814 and died in Saint-Germain-en-Laye on 15 July 1894. Honoré's son was legitimized, but the throne nevertheless passed to Honoré's brother, Florestan.

References

1778 births
1841 deaths
19th-century Princes of Monaco
19th-century viceregal rulers
House of Grimaldi
Hereditary Princes of Monaco
Princes of Monaco
Burials at the Cathedral of Our Lady Immaculate
Monegasque princes
Regents of Monaco
Marquesses of Baux
Monegasque people of Italian descent
Dukes of Valentinois

Dukes of Mayenne